Auxa is a genus of beetles in the family Cerambycidae, containing the following species:

 Auxa armata (Coquerel, 1851)
 Auxa basirufipennis Breuning, 1980
 Auxa bimaculipennis Breuning, 1957
 Auxa divaricata (Coquerel, 1851)
 Auxa dorsata (Fairmaire, 1902)
 Auxa fuscolineata Breuning, 1957
 Auxa gibbicollis Fairmaire, 1902
 Auxa griveaudi Breuning, 1980
 Auxa lineolata Fairmaire, 1897
 Auxa longidens Breuning, 1957
 Auxa mediofasciata Breuning, 1940
 Auxa mimodivaricata Breuning, 1980
 Auxa nigritarsis Breuning, 1957
 Auxa obliquata Breuning, 1939
 Auxa paragibbicollis Breuning, 1975
 Auxa parvidens Fairmaire, 1897
 Auxa pauliani Breuning, 1957
 Auxa perroti Breuning, 1957
 Auxa pulchra Breuning, 1966
 Auxa rufoflava Breuning, 1970
 Auxa scriptidorsis Fairmaire, 1897
 Auxa sericea Breuning, 1957
 Auxa subdivaricata Breuning, 1957
 Auxa subobliquata Breuning, 1957
 Auxa subtruncata Breuning, 1966
 Auxa unicolor Breuning, 1940
 Auxa vadoni Breuning, 1957

References

 
Apomecynini
Cerambycidae genera